The Global Virtual Reality Association (GVRA) is a non-profit organization to assist the development of virtual reality. The association aims to promote dialogue between stakeholders by setting up working groups and developing best practices.

History
On 7 December, 2016, the Global Virtual Reality Association was announced with the goal of promoting responsible development and adoption of VR.

Members
StarVR (Acer and Starbreeze Studios)
Google
HTC
Oculus
Samsung
Sony

References

External links

Organizations established in 2016
Virtual reality organizations